Charles O. Dickerson High School is a public high school in Trumansburg, New York, United States. It is part of the Trumansburg Central School District, and has an enrollment of approximately 485 students. The principal is Fayan Grant-Rhoden.

Charles O. Dickerson High School is also commonly known as Trumansburg High School, or TCS (for Trumansburg Central School). Their sports mascot is the Blue Raider. School colors are Blue & Gold

2014 Capital Project

The school recently underwent a capital project, in which several aspects of the school were remodeled and revamped, such as the water systems and roof. The most notable aspect of this undertaking was the creation of a new rubber outdoor track, which replaced an old, cracked asphalt track and rutted football field.

Unfortunately, the budget for the project did not extend to new outdoor bathrooms by the track; to build these, the sports boosters club has held fundraisers to gather the money and the building is being built almost entirely by volunteers. As of January 2017, they are not completed yet.

See also
List of high schools in New York

References

External links
Official Charles O. Dickerson High School website

Public high schools in New York (state)
Schools in Tompkins County, New York